The Mystery of the Strange Bundle is a children's novel written by Enid Blyton and published in 1952. It is the tenth book of The Five Find-Outers mystery series.

Plot
After being robbed in the middle of the night, Mr. Fellows runs away while carrying a large bundle. After he disappears, his house is found in disarray. The five children must investigate to find out what happened with Mr. Fellows.

References

External links
Enid Blyton Society page
The Mystery of the Strange Bundle at Faded Page

1952 British novels
Novels by Enid Blyton
Methuen Publishing books
1952 children's books